Sankt Anton im Montafon is a town in the Montafon valley in the district of Bludenz in the Austrian state of Vorarlberg.

It is a popular ski resort, and much of the population makes a living from tourism.

Population

References

External links
Official website
Golm ski resort

Cities and towns in Bludenz District